Mamić is a surname. It may refer to:

Bojan Mamić (born 1981), Serbian footballer 
Drago Mamić (born 1954), football manager
Josipa Mamić (born 1994), handball player
Marko Mamić (born 1994), handball player
Matej Mamić (born 1975), basketball player
Petar Mamić (born 1996), footballer
Sanda Mamić (born 1985), Croatian tennis player 
Zdravko Mamić (born 1959), Croatian football manager 
Zoran Mamić (born 1971), Croatian footballer 

Croatian surnames